Noam Sheriff (born 7 January 1935 – ) was an Israeli composer, conductor, educator and arranger. Sheriff was one of Israel’s most versatile and world-renowned musicians. He was Artistic Director of Israel Netanya Kibbutz Orchestra (1973-1982); Music Director of the Israel Symphony Orchestra Rishon LeZion (1989-1995); Professor of Composition and Conducting at the Tel Aviv University's Samuel Rubin Academy of Music (renamed the Buchmann-Mehta School of Music)  since 1990 and the Academy's director (1998- 2000); Artistic Director of the Israel Chamber Orchestra (2002-2005); and Artistic Director of the Haifa Symphony Orchestra (2004-2013).

Early life
Noam Sheriff studied composition in Tel Aviv with Paul Ben-Haim and in Berlin with Boris Blacher, conducting in Salzburg with Igor Markevitch, and philosophy at the Hebrew University, Jerusalem.

Noam Sheriff studied composition with Paul Ben-Haim in Tel Aviv and Boris Blacher in Berlin, conducting with Igor Markevitch in Salzburg, and philosophy at the Hebrew University in Jerusalem.

Work as composer
Since the 1957 premiere of his work Festival Prelude by the Israel Philharmonic Orchestra under Leonard Bernstein at the opening of the Mann Auditorium in Tel Aviv, his works have been regularly performed in Israel and all over the world.

In Noam Sheriff’s music one finds an original solution to the fusion of East and West, of musical elements from ancient Mediterranean cultures and from the West. Among his most significant works are the three scale vocal compositions that form a trilogy. Mechaye Hamethim (Revival of the Dead) which was premiered in Amsterdam by the IPO in 1987, based on the Jewish East-European traditional music as well as on the ancient oriental Jewish themes of the Samaritans. Sephardic Passion, which was premiered in Toledo, Spain, by the IPO, Zubin Mehta and Plácido Domingo in 1992, is based on the music of the Sephardic Jewry. Psalms of Jerusalem was premiered in 1995 in Jerusalem to open the 3000 year celebrations of that city with its four choirs around the hall singing in Hebrew and Latin.

His Mechaye Hamethim was performed by the IPO under Mehta in a unique concert at Yad Vashem Holocaust Museum, Jerusalem, marking Israel’s Jubilee, and will additionally feature in the 2012 Salzburg Festival. Sheriff's newest vocal work, Genesis, was commissioned and premiered by the Israel Philharmonic and Maestro Zubin Mehta at the festive concerts of Israel’s 50th Independence day. Sheriff completed an opera called Hagolem (The Clay Automaton).

Work as conductor
Noam Sheriff regularly conducted both his compositions and other works of the orchestral repertoire all over the world. Between 1989 and 1995 he was the Music Director of the Israel Symphony Orchestra Rishon LeZion which, under his leadership, achieved unprecedented success in Israeli musical history. Since January 2002 he has been the Music Director of the Israel Chamber Orchestra, which, in its first season under his leadership (2002–03), won the praise of the critics and audiences. In April 2004 he was nominated Music Director of the New Haifa Symphony Orchestra.

Academic career
Since 1963 Noam Sheriff has been teaching composition and conducting. He has taught at such institutes as the Hebrew University and Tel Aviv University as well as the Musikhochschule in Cologne and the Mozarteum in Salzburg. Over the years he has directed many music festivals in Israel as well as various television and radio programs. Since 1990 Noam Sheriff has been professor of composition and conducting at the Tel Aviv University's Rubin Academy of Music. In the years 1998–2000 he was its Director.

Awards
 In 1991, Sheriff won the ACUM Prize, for his life's work.
 In 2003, he was awarded the EMET Prize, for music.
 In 2011, he was awarded the Israel Prize, for music.

He has also been nominated as one of the 50 most influential figures in Israeli music.

Selected works
Noam Sheriff's works are published by IMI and by C.F. Peters Edition, Frankfurt.

Festival Prelude, 1957
Heptaprism, Ballet, 1965
Israel-Suite, 1967
May Ko Mashma Lan..., Essay for harp and string quartet, 1976
Essay for string orchestra, 1977
Prayer for strings, 1983
La Follia Variations, 1984
Partita for viola and cello, "LI-GUR" 1984
Mechaye Hamethim (Revival of the Dead), 1985
Sephardic Passion, 1992
Scarlattiana, piano concerto, 1994
Psalms of Jerusalem, 1995
Wenn das Pendel der Liebe schwingt..., Six Songs after Paul Celan, 1996
Akeda, 1997
Bereshit,1998
Golem 13, Opera, 2008

See also
List of Israel Prize recipients

References

External links
 Noam Sheriff's website
 Sheriff's home page at C.F. Peters edition
 Resume of Noam Sheriff (in Hebrew), Israel Prize website.

1935 births
2018 deaths
20th-century classical composers
Israeli classical musicians
Israeli male composers
Israeli conductors (music)
Jewish classical musicians
Israel Prize in music recipients
EMET Prize recipients in Culture and Art
Jewish Israeli musicians
Israeli people of Belarusian-Jewish descent
Male classical composers
21st-century classical composers
20th-century conductors (music)
21st-century conductors (music)
20th-century Israeli male musicians
21st-century Israeli male musicians
Academic staff of Ono Academic College